Miss University Africa 2017, the 5th edition of the Miss University Africa pageant, was held on 2 December 2017 at Obi Wali International Conference Center in Port Harcourt. Contestants from 54 African countries competed for the crown. The winner, Lorriane Nadal of Mauritius succeeded Rorisang Molefe of Lesotho, as the reigning Miss University Africa Queen. She was crowned by First Lady of Rivers State, Eberechi Wike at the end of the event.

Results

Contestants

The contestants from 54 African countries arrived Rivers State on 19 November 2017.

  – Djanet Metouri
  – Maria Adao
  – Ornela Do Marcolino
  – Olorato Lefenya
  – Carine Yanogo
  – Ornella Gahimbare
  – Blessing Obiora
  – Miriam Monteiro
  – Leila Tadjiri
  – Sarah Kuediaba
  – Solia Bamba
  – Esther Uha
  – Fard York
  – Tahany Hassan
  – Aida Mebrahtu
  – Misker Kassahun
  – Adama Larah
  – Lawratou Camara
  – Perpetual Acquah
  – Fatoumata Camara
  – Leontina Yonta Lacerda
  – Goretti Mirera
  – Nthole Matela
  – Winnie Freeman
  – Njara Windye
  – Epylen Chimasula
  – Tahiratou BA
  – Toubi Brown
  – Lorriane Nadal
  – Ikram Bayaddou
  – Liana Loforte
  – Fatima Shaningwa
  – Miriam Abdou Saley 
  – Chinonso KimOprah Opara
  – Linda Umutoniwase
  – Maria Andreza
  – Charlotte Cisse
  – Falaine Dora
  – Enid Jones-Boston
  – Phahima Kullow
  – Tshiamo Moahloli
  – Akuch Biar
  – Tasneem Tiana Adams
  – Baby Mthimkhulu
  – Nasreen Abdul
  –  Michelle Kuassi
  – Rahma Segni
  – Jane Mulungi
  – Emmah Mwaba
  – Maita K. Kainga

Debuts

Judges
The performances of Miss University Africa 2017 contestants were evaluated by a panel of judges. Broadcaster and journalist Soni Irabor was the lead judge at the pageant, along with Mrs. Tolulope Nazzal, Executive Vice President- Miss University Africa Organization and a list of other judges.

References

2010s in Rivers State
2017 beauty pageants
Events in Port Harcourt
December 2017 events in Africa
21st century in Port Harcourt
Beauty pageants in Nigeria
December 2017 events in Nigeria